Lewistown High School, or LHS, is a public four-year high school located at 15205 North IL Route 100 in Lewistown, Illinois, a small city in Fulton County, in the Midwestern United States. LHS is part of Lewistown Community Unit School District 97, which serves the communities of Bryant, Lewistown, Little America, and St. David. The campus 13 miles southwest of Canton, and serves a mixed small city, village, and rural residential community. The school districts lies within the Canton micropolitan statistical area.

Academics
In 2009 Lewistown High School did not make Adequate Yearly Progress, with 57% of students meeting standards, on the Prairie State Achievement Examination, a state test that is part of the No Child Left Behind Act. The school's average high school graduation rate between 1999–2009 was 86%.

Athletics and activities
Lewistown High School competes in the Prairieland Conference and is a member school of the Illinois High School Association. The LHS mascot is the Indians with colors of scarlet red and Columbia blue. The school has one state championships on record in team athletics and activities, Boys Baseball in 1992–1993.

The school offers competitive athletics opportunities in the following sports:
 Boys Baseball
 Boys and Girls Basketball
 Girls Cheerleading
 Boys and Girls Cross Country
 Girls Dance Team
 Boys Football
 Girls Softball
 Boys and Girls Track & Field
 Girls Volleyball

The school offers the activities in the following areas:
Marching Band
Chorus
FCCLA
Future Farmers of America (FFA)
Legend
National Honor Society
Scholastic Bowl
Science Olympiad
Spanish Club
Spanish National Honor Society
Speech
Student Senate
Tube band
Web Design

History

One source of potential material includes:.

References

External links
 Lewistown High School

Public high schools in Illinois
Schools in Fulton County, Illinois